The Illinois Channel is a 501 c (3) nonprofit corporation, modeled after C-SPAN, which produces programming on Illinois state government, politics and public policy.

Early history

In 1999, Barbara Ferrara, of the University of Illinois at Springfield, wrote a grant request to launch a study into what would be needed to start an Illinois version of C-SPAN. The Joyce Foundation approved the grant and awarded $396,000 to fund the project. The MacArthur Foundation also donated $50,000 toward the project.  Terry Martin, a former member of C-SPAN's Congressional coverage team, who had also worked in local news covering Illinois politics, was selected as the study's Project Director.

The study was guided by a 50-member Blue Ribbon panel, led by former Illinois Governor, Jim Edgar, and former US Senator Paul Simon. During the first meeting of the Planning Study's Advisory Board, the name Illinois Channel was selected as the new name for this effort to launch a statewide public affairs network.  During the study an examination of other states' efforts were examined, the nonprofit corporation was established under IRS rules, and initial production and distribution was begun. The first Illinois Channel program, involved coverage of the Illinois Supreme Court hearing a case on redistricting Illinois' political districts, following the 2000 census.

Independent Nonprofit Corporation

In December 2002, the Illinois Channel Planning Study concluded.  Among the recommendation of the study, was that the nonprofit organization operating the Channel, should be free of any affiliations with other organizations, including the University of Illinois Springfield, which had conducted the study.  This was done, so that every institution of high education in Illinois would feel it had an equal opportunity to have their public affairs programming televised.

In January 2003, the Illinois Channel began independent operations in the Illinois Municipal League's building at 500 East Capitol Street, in Springfield.  Among the initial Board members to serve on the new nonprofit, were former US Senator Adlai Stevenson, whose father had twice run for President [ 1952 & 1956 ], Illinois newsman Mike Lawrence, who was a confidant of both Gov. Jim Edgar and Senator Paul Simon. Terry Martin, who had led the Planning Study, stayed with the project as Executive Director.

Funding the Illinois Channel remained a private sector function, and was launched with a $50,000 grant from Boeing, a $3000 grant from the Illinois Bar Association, and some $30,000 in remaining funds from the planning study.

Growth & Benchmarks

In subsequent years, more and more communities added the Illinois Channel's programming. Though the study had called for the Illinois Channel to be operated 24/7, across the state, a lack of adequate funds continued to limit the Channel to producing two hours of weekly programming.  But this programming was well received, and over the next few years, the Illinois Channel's listing of communities where its programming was available on cable, grew to over 128, which connected some 1,400,000 cable homes to the Channel.

The Illinois Channel was among the first television broadcasters to videostream its programming, launching its videostreaming service in February, 2003.

The Illinois Channel was the first—and to date only—broadcaster which the Illinois Supreme Court allowed to use two cameras to record its proceedings. Under the rules of the Illinois Supreme Court, only one camera is allowed in the Chamber.

In November 2003, then Illinois State Senator Barack Obama seeking the Democratic nomination for the US Senate seat, was interviewed on the Illinois Channel.  Obama, who was running behind candidate Blair Hull at the time, went on to win the nomination, the seat in the US Senate, and in 2008, was elected the 44th President of the United States.

In 2004, the Chicago Medical Society recognized the quality of the Illinois Channel's coverage of the looming Medical Malpractice issues, when it granted the Channel its "Grassroots in Medicine" award, for non-medical providers who advance the cause of medicine.

In 2008, the Champaign County Medical Society recognized the Channel with its award, for its medical coverage.

And demonstrating its appeal to both sides as a nonpartisan broadcaster, in November, 2008, Keith Hebeisen who had been the President of the Illinois Trial Lawyers Association in 2004 when the Medical Malpractice issue was at its zenith, joined the Illinois Channel Board, where he joined Dr. Neil Winston, who had served as President of the Chicago Medical Society in 2004.

References

External links

Legislature broadcasters in the United States
Television stations in Illinois
Springfield, Illinois
Companies based in Sangamon County, Illinois